Bodies of Evidence may refer to:

 "Bodies of Evidence" (The Outer Limits), an episode of The Outer Limits
 Bodies of Evidence (TV series), an American television police drama series

See also  
 Body of Evidence (disambiguation)